Ashrafpur Kichhauchha is a town and a nagar panchayat in Ambedkar Nagar District in the state of Uttar Pradesh, India. It is well known worldwide as here the shrine of the famous Chisti Sufi saint Sultan Syed Makhdoom Ashraf Jahangir Semnani is located, which attracts millions of devotees irrespective of religion, caste, creed and sex all the year round. The nearest railway station is the Akbarpur station which is about 23 kilometers. Akbarpur station is connected by rail to big cities such as Kolkata, Delhi, Lucknow, Varanasi and Mumbai.

Demographics 
 India census, Ashrafpur Kichhauchha had a population of 13,420.  Males constitute 51% of the population and females 49%. Ashrafpur Kichhauchha has an average literacy rate of -98%, lower than the national average of 59.5%; with 61% of the males and 39% of females literate. 21% of the population is under 6 years of age.

Notable People 
 Ashraf Jahangir Semnani
 Abdur-Razzaq Nurul-Ain
 Syed Amin Ashraf
 Syed Waheed Ashraf
 Syeda Ummehani Ashraf
 Syed Mohammad Madni Ashrafi
Syed Mohammed Mukhtar Ashraf

References

External links 

Cities and towns in Ambedkar Nagar district